The 2013 Rock Cup started on 16 March 2013 and ended on 1 June 2013.

First round
The matches took place from 16 to 19 March 2013.

|}

Second round
The matches took place from 13 to 20 April 2013.

|}

Quarterfinals
The matches took place from 11 to 14 May 2013.

|}

Semifinals
The matches took place on 25 May 2013.

|}

Final
The match took place on 1 June 2013.

|}

References

Rock Cup
Rock Cup
Rock Cup